Laura Zialor (born 4 August 1998) is an English international athlete. She has represented England at the Commonwealth Games.

Biography
Zialor was educated at the University of Birmingham and won the British indoor high jump title in 2022. She recorded a personal best of 1.91 metres in May 2022. She had previously won the silver medal at the 2021 British Athletics Championships.

In 2022, she was selected for the women's high jump event at the 2022 Commonwealth Games in Birmingham.

References

1998 births
Living people
English high jumpers
British high jumpers
Commonwealth Games competitors for England
Athletes (track and field) at the 2022 Commonwealth Games